Eudaniela is a genus of crabs in the family Pseudothelphusidae, containing the following species:

Taxonomy
Kingdom - Animalia				
Phylum - Arthropoda				
Class - Crustacea
Order - Decapoda
Family - Pseudothelphusidae

Location
Eudaniela can be found  are found along the Andean and Coastal Cordillera of Venezuela and in the highlands of Isla Margarita, Trinidad and Tobago. The Eudaniela species live in freshwater streams and rivers at a high altitude above sea level.

On Tobago, the Eudaniela Garmani crab constructs burrows or hides in naturally occurring crevices near fast-flowing streams. Owing to the nature of the terrain surrounding these streams, the Eudaniela Garmani crabs are less likely to be observed creating their own burrows.

Biology
Eudaniela has been recorded to reach sexual maturity at a large size and also at a relatively old age. The female reaches its sexual maturity at about three years of age. There is not enough data or information known to determine if the Eudaniela is in threat of being an endangered species.

Eudaniela shell colour has been observed to change with increasing size, with smaller Eudaniela (<25 mm Carapace Width (CW)) being dark brown and larger Eudaniela (>50mm CW) being chestnut brown.

Diet 
Eudaniela have a distinctive stance when catching prey, adopting a sit and wait strategy. Using the tips of two of their legs supporting them in the water, they used the other two legs to gently sweep back and forth. When prey is detected a pouncing action was observed.

Eudaniela has been reported as being one of the very few examples of invertebrates preying on vertebrates. Several sightings (albeit not active predation) of Eudaniela feeding on snakes have been recorded. Additionally, it was observed that the Eudaniela prefer to dexterously skin the snakes using their pincers prior to consumption 

It has been postulated that within the Tobago ecosystem the Eudaniela is the Apex predator, with no evident predation by other organisms noted.

Species
 Eudaniela casanarensis (Campos, 2001)
 Eudaniela pestai (Pretzmann, 1965)
 Eudaniela Garmani (Maitland, 2003)

References

Pseudothelphusidae